is a Japanese footballer who plays as a goalkeeper for Yokohama F. Marinos.

Career statistics

Club

References

External links

1997 births
Living people
Sportspeople from Saitama (city)
Ryutsu Keizai University alumni
Japanese footballers
Japan youth international footballers
Footballers at the 2018 Asian Games
Medalists at the 2018 Asian Games
Asian Games medalists in football
Asian Games silver medalists for Japan
Japanese people of Nigerian descent
Sportspeople of Nigerian descent
Association football goalkeepers
J1 League players
Yokohama F. Marinos players
J2 League players
Tochigi SC players